William Richard Gorsline (January 28, 1824March 30, 1879) was an associate justice of the Colorado Territorial Supreme Court from 1866 to 1870. He previously served as a circuit court judge in Wisconsin and a district judge in Colorado.

Early life
Gorsline was born in Manlius, New York, on January 28, 1824. He was orphaned and an uncle raised him. He did well in school and began studying law in his hometown. In 1845, he moved to Milwaukee, Wisconsin Territory, and continued studying law with Frank Randall and was admitted to the bar later that year. He then opened up his own law office in Sheboygan, Wisconsin.  In 1845 and 1846, he served as the register of deeds for Sheboygan County.

From 1850 to 1851, he served as a county judge in Sheboygan County. Then from about 1851 to July 1858, he served as the third judge of the fourth judicial circuit of the state of Wisconsin. At that time, he resigned and moved to Colorado.

Career in Colorado
In Colorado, Gorsline settled in Gilpin County and established a law practice. In 1860, President James Buchanan appointed him district judge, a position to which President Andrew Johnson later reappointed him. On June 18, 1866, President Johnson appointed him to serve as an associate justice of the Supreme Court of the Territory of Colorado. He served on the court until 1870.

Death
Gorsline died in Denver on March 2, 1879. He is buried in Wildwood Cemetery in Sheboygan.

References

External links

1824 births
1879 deaths
People from Manlius, New York
People from Sheboygan, Wisconsin
People from Central City, Colorado
U.S. state supreme court judges admitted to the practice of law by reading law
Justices of the Colorado Supreme Court
County officials in Wisconsin
Wisconsin lawyers
Wisconsin state court judges
Colorado Territory officials
Colorado lawyers
Road incident deaths in Colorado
19th-century American judges
19th-century American lawyers